There have been two baronetcies created for persons with the surname Henderson, one in the Baronetage of Nova Scotia and one in the Baronetage of the United Kingdom.

The Henderson Baronetcy, of Fordell (agnatic primogeniture) in the County of Fife, was created in the Baronetage of Nova Scotia on 15 July 1664 for John Henderson. The fifth Baronet sat as Member of Parliament for Fife, Kirkcaldy Burghs, Seaford and Stirling Burghs.  The title became extinct on the death of the sixth Baronet in 1833.(The pretenders to the baronetcy would logically be the descendants of Capt. James Henderson (1618-1644), uncle of the 1st Baronet. But no one in his descendants seems to have claimed the title officially.)

The Henderson Baronetcy, of Buscot Park in the County of Berkshire, was created in the Baronetage of the United Kingdom on 24 July 1902. For more information on this creation, see the Baron Faringdon.

Henderson baronets, of Fordell (1664)
Sir John Henderson, 1st Baronet (died 1683) 
Sir William Henderson, 2nd Baronet (died 1709) 
Sir John Henderson, 3rd Baronet (1686–) 
Sir Robert Henderson, 4th Baronet (died 1781) 
Sir John Henderson, 5th Baronet (1762–1817) 
Sir Robert Bruce Henderson, 6th Baronet (c. 1763–1833)

Henderson baronets, of Buscot Park (1902)
see the Baron Faringdon

References

Kidd, Charles, Williamson, David (editors). Debrett's Peerage and Baronetage (1990 edition). New York: St Martin's Press, 1990.

Baronetcies in the Baronetage of the United Kingdom
Extinct baronetcies in the Baronetage of Nova Scotia
1664 establishments in Nova Scotia